Boisdale is a closed station located in the town of Boisdale, on the Briagolong railway line in Victoria, Australia.

History
The station opened concurrently with the Briagolong railway line in 1889, and was 224 km from Southern Cross. The main items freighted at the station were sugar beet and firewood. In 1902, a farmer named John Bennett fell off the platform at the station onto the rails, breaking two of his ribs. Bennett ultimately was compensated by the Railway Department with a "substantial settlement".

Boisdale station was closed to passenger traffic in 1930. The station ultimately closed fully in 1952, after which the station building was demolished and the tracks removed. On 6 January 1955, the Shire of Maffra council submitted an application to Victorian Railways to acquire the site of the former Boisdale railway station, and ownership was granted to the shire in August 1962. Today, the railway station site is home to the Boisdale Recreation Reserve, which opened in 1968.

References

Disused railway stations in Victoria (Australia)
Briagolong railway line
Railway stations in Australia opened in 1889
Railway stations closed in 1952
Transport in Gippsland (region)
Shire of Wellington